Marguerite-Charlotte David (born Marguerite-Charlotte Pécoul) (1764–1826) was the French wife of the painter Jacques-Louis David.

Marguerite-Charlotte was roughly half the age of her husband when they married on 16 May 1782. They had four children: Charles Louis Jules David (born 19 February 1783), François Eugène David (born 27 April 1784), and the twin daughters Laure Émilie Félicité David and Pauline Jeanne David (born 26 October 1786).

In 1784 Jacques-Louis David painted pendant portraits of his parents-in-law. By that time David-Pécoul's birth mother had died, and her father had married his second wife Geneviève Jacqueline, née Potain, who was the sister of the architect Nicolas Marie Potain. The portraits were possibly painted on the occasion of this second marriage:

David-Pécoul divorced her rebelling husband in 1793 for voting against the king during the Reign of Terror but after his imprisonment in 1794–1795 she remarried him in 1796. In 1795 he painted pendant portraits of Charlotte's sister Emilie and her husband Pierre Seriziat, with their son:

In 1812 David painted pendant portraits of his daughters Laure Émilie Félicité and Pauline Jeanne:

Daughter Laure was married to Baron Claude Marie Meunier:

Daughter Pauline Jeanne was married to Jean-Baptiste Jeanin:

When the painter was forced to leave Paris in 1815, David-Pécoul joined him in exile in Brussels where he enjoyed a career as painter and teacher before dying in 1825.

After her husband died she tried to have him buried in Paris, but even after death he was refused repatriation and he is buried in Brussels cemetery. She moved back to Paris, where she died the following year and is buried in Père Lachaise cemetery along with her children. David's son had Jacques-Louis David's heart buried alongside the remains of his wife at Père Lachaise.

References
 1880 comprehensive biography and catalog Le peintre Louis David, 1748-1825 and accompanying illustrations by his grandson, Jacques Louis Jules David (1829-1886)

External links 
 Short biography
Painting record on museum website

1764 births
1826 deaths
People from Paris
18th-century French women
19th-century French women
Jacques-Louis David